General José Francisco Bermúdez Airport  is an airport serving the Caribbean coastal city of Carúpano, Venezuela. The airport is named in honor of José Francisco Bermúdez, a general in the Venezuelan War of Independence.

The Carupano non-directional beacon (Ident: CUP) is located on the field.

Airlines and destinations

See also
Transport in Venezuela
List of airports in Venezuela

References

External links
OurAirports - Carúpano
OpenStreetMap - Carúpano
SkyVector - Carupano

Airports in Venezuela
Buildings and structures in Sucre (state)